Wardynka is a river of Poland, a tributary of the Stobnica near Wardyń.

Rivers of Poland
Rivers of West Pomeranian Voivodeship